The 1951 Rhineland-Palatinate state election was conducted on 29 April 1951 to elect members to the Landtag, the state legislature of Rhineland-Palatinate, West Germany.

|-
|colspan=15| 
|-
! style="background-color:#E9E9E9;text-align:left;" width=300px colspan=2|Party
! style="background-color:#E9E9E9;text-align:right;" width=50px |Vote %
! style="background-color:#E9E9E9;text-align:right;" width=50px |Vote % ±
! style="background-color:#E9E9E9;text-align:right;" width=50px |Seats
! style="background-color:#E9E9E9;text-align:right;" width=50px |Seats ±
|-
| width=5px style="background-color: " |
| style="text-align:left;" | Christian Democratic Union
| style="text-align:right;" | 39.2
| style="text-align:right;" | –8.0
| style="text-align:right;" | 43
| style="text-align:right;" | –5
|-
| style="background-color: " |
| style="text-align:left;" | Social Democratic Party
| style="text-align:right;" | 34.0
| style="text-align:right;" | –0.3
| style="text-align:right;" | 38
| style="text-align:right;" | +4
|-
| style="background-color: " |
| style="text-align:left;" | Free Democratic Party
| style="text-align:right;" | 16.9
| style="text-align:right;" | +7.1
| style="text-align:right;" | 19
| style="text-align:right;" | +8
|-
| style="background-color: " |
| style="text-align:left;" | Communist Party of Germany
| style="text-align:right;" | 4.3
| style="text-align:right;" | –4.4
| style="text-align:right;" | 0
| style="text-align:right;" | –8
|-
| style="background-color: " |
| style="text-align:left;" | Deutsche Reichspartei
| style="text-align:right;" | 0.5
| style="text-align:right;" | N/A
| style="text-align:right;" | 0
| style="text-align:right;" | N/A
|-
| style="background-color: " |
| style="text-align:left;" | Others
| style="text-align:right;" | 5.3
| style="text-align:right;" | N/A
| style="text-align:right;" | 0
| style="text-align:right;" | N/A
|- style="background: #E9E9E9"
! style="text-align:left;" colspan=2| Total
| 100.0
| —
| 100
| –1
|-
| colspan=9 style="text-align:left;" | Source: parties-and-elections.de
|}

1951
1951 elections in Germany
1951 in West Germany